Frederick George Burgess (16 July 1871 – 31 March 1951) was a British politician and trade unionist.

Burgess worked on the railways for many years and became active in the Amalgamated Society of Railway Servants and its successor, the National Union of Railwaymen.  Increasingly holding prominent offices in the union, including secretary of the Maidstone branch for seventeen years, he also served on various government committees during World War I.  He also became active in the Labour Party, and stood unsuccessfully for Maidstone at the 1918 general election.  Despite his lack of success, he left the railway industry the following year (refusing a post as night porter at NUR headquarters), and worked as a political agent and lecturer, also producing political cartoons and articles under the pseudonym of "Battersea Bowser".

At the 1929 general election, Burgess stood in York and won the seat.  He lost it at the 1931 general election, then moved to contest Accrington in 1935, but was again unsuccessful.  In 1937, he was elected to represent Camberwell North West on London County Council, serving until 1949.  He also served on Camberwell Metropolitan Borough Council. He served as Camberwell's mayor from 1947 until 1949, taking over from his wife Jessie Burgess who held the role from 1945 to 1947.

References

1871 births
1951 deaths
English trade unionists
Labour Party (UK) MPs for English constituencies
Mayors of places in Greater London
Members of London County Council
National Union of Railwaymen-sponsored MPs
UK MPs 1929–1931